Life of Crime is a 2013 American black comedy crime film written and directed by Daniel Schechter, based on Elmore Leonard's novel The Switch (1978), which includes characters later revisited in his novel Rum Punch (1992), which was adapted into the Quentin Tarantino film Jackie Brown (1997). Life of Crime was screened on the closing night 2013 Toronto International Film Festival, on the opening day of the Abu Dhabi Film Festival, at the 2014 Traverse City Film Festival and released in theaters on August 29, 2014 by Lionsgate and Roadside Attractions.

Premise
In Detroit in 1978, stoic socialite Mickey Dawson becomes the target of an ill-planned kidnapping plot by a pair of fumbling ex-cons, Ordell Robbie and Louis Gara, looking for a get-rich-quick scheme. However, things become complicated for the duo when her wealthy husband, Frank, refuses to pay the ransom, as he is on the cusp of filing for divorce to make way for his mistress, Melanie Ralston. The two kidnappers have to figure out how to quickly turn the tables before their time runs out.

Cast

 Jennifer Aniston as Margaret "Mickey" Dawson
 Yasiin Bey as Ordell Robbie
 Isla Fisher as Melanie Ralston
 Will Forte as Marshall Taylor
 Mark Boone Junior as Richard
 Tim Robbins as Frank Dawson
 John Hawkes as Louis Gara
 Charlie Tahan as Bo Dawson
 Seana Kofoed as Kay
 Chyna Layne as Loretta
 Clea Lewis as Tyra Taylor
 Kevin Corrigan as Ray
 Leonard Robinson as Officer Dixon
 Jenna Nye as Shelly Taylor
 Alex Ladove as Pamela Taylor
 R. Marcus Taylor as Borsalino

Production
Dennis Quaid was originally cast as Frank Dawson, Mickey's husband.

Principal photography lasted 26 days. The major portion of the film was shot in Greenwich, Connecticut. Tod A. Maitland did the sound mixing.

Reception
Life of Crime received generally positive reviews from critics. The site's consensus reads: "It may not stand shoulder-to-shoulder with the best Elmore Leonard adaptations, but Life of Crime has enough ambling charm—and a sharp enough cast—to get by." Metacritic, which assigns a weighted average score from 1 to 100 to reviews from mainstream critics, gave the film a 60 based on 28 critics.

Catherine Shoard of The Guardian praised Schecter for his "unexpectedly winning take" on Leonard's novel and the "top-notch" performances from the cast, highlighting Aniston for her "deft comic timing" and Hawkes for being "surprisingly convincing" in his role, concluding that: "This is a good-natured, show-not-tell treat, almost bloodless fun." Glenn Kenny of RogerEbert.com called it "a pretty engaging, and [pretty] authentically Leonardesque, comedic crime movie" and praised the ensemble cast's performances, singling out Aniston's part for being "measured, engrossing, and empathy-generating" without any "sitcom-style" mannerisms, concluding that: "The amusing twists and turns of the script, the multiple instances of bracing humor and consistent tension, help the cast bring this small-scale thriller to the place it clearly wants to be. Well worth seeing, particularly for Leonard people." Ben Kenigsberg of The New York Times wrote that it pales in comparison to Jackie Brown and found Bey to be "droll" as Ordell Robbie, but called it a "late-summer caper movie" that settles into its groove and offers an "intriguing contrast of actors and a director taking a different approach to known material."

Michael O'Sullivan of The Washington Post commended Hawkes and Bey for doing "an adequate job" portraying their characters but felt the story they inhabit was "noticeably sluggish and spiritless" compared to Tarantino's film, and lacked a sense of urgency in its overall setup. Steve Macfarlane of Slant Magazine criticized Schecter for crafting his film with "obnoxiously self-aware period detail" and a "too-rich soundtrack" when compared to American Hustle and felt the performances had an "undeniably comparable dramatic weightlessness" to them, highlighting Aniston for being miscast in her role and giving "a long, bland starring performance in an Indiewood dramedy." Entertainment Weeklys Chris Nashawaty gave the movie a "C−" grade, calling it one of the worst Leonard adaptations based on Schecter's "lifeless" filmmaking, and backhandedly complimenting its "kitschy" production for distracting viewers away from the rest of the film.

References

External links
 
 
 

2013 films
2013 black comedy films
2010s American films
2010s crime comedy films
2010s English-language films
Adultery in films
American black comedy films
American crime comedy films
American neo-noir films
Echo Films films
Films about hostage takings
Films about kidnapping
Films based on American novels
Films based on crime novels
Films based on works by Elmore Leonard
Films produced by Jennifer Aniston
Films scored by the Newton Brothers
Films set in 1978
Films set in Detroit
Films shot in Connecticut
Lionsgate films
Roadside Attractions films